San Carlos Correctional Facility (SCCF) is a maximum security facility on the campus of the Colorado Mental Health Institute in Pueblo, Colorado.

SCCF houses inmates with special needs, such as severe mental illness or severe developmental disabilities. Inmates at SCCF are temporarily transferred there from other state prisons in order to receive specialized care.

References 

Buildings and structures in Pueblo, Colorado
Prisons in Colorado
Government buildings completed in 1995
1995 establishments in Colorado